Baker High School is located in unincorporated Mobile County, Alabama, west of Mobile, and is a public high school operated by the Mobile County Public School System. The school educates students in grades 9-12. Baker High School is the largest high school in Mobile County with over 2,300 students enrolled and the second largest school in the state of Alabama.

History 
Baker School, established in 1903, was originally a one classroom school for grades 1-12. In 1927, the school became an official part of the Mobile County Public School System. This change brought new buildings to the campus. In 1930, the building to the right of the original school house would serve as the main building. The school received so much growth to the extent that a state-of-the-art building had to be built behind the historic structure. In the 1960s the school was split in two with lower and upper class levels. Also, new buildings were built with the lower elementary school absorbing the original building, and a 2-story building built for the high school. Later after the school districts were reformed, the elementary school would be renamed to Elsie Collier Elementary and moved to Snow Road. The old buildings became Causey Middle School. Causey was later moved to Snow Road, and the old Causey buildings were once again added as part of Baker High School. In early 2008, the school system decided to demolish the 107-years-old building. The old "annex" that was once Baker School, then Baker Elementary, then Causey Middle, still remains and is now the "Freshman Academy".

Building 
The current main building was built in the late 1970s to accommodate a growing West Mobile population. The building was built as a Bomb/Storm Shelter with no exterior windows in the original design. The walls are steel reinforced concrete. A concourse connects the main structure to the gym and new auditorium.  The school was remodeled starting in 2001 and ending in 2004. The gym was expanded 40 yards, an auditorium was built, the main building was repainted, walls replaced, a sprinkler system added, and new doors installed with windows, the football stadium was expanded to twice the previous capacity and two new buildings were added to the campus as a freshman annex. The school has its own baseball field, softball field, football and soccer stadium, basketball gym, track, and practice field for football, soccer, and band. The original building from 1903 was torn down in early 2008 and was listed as a historic landmark by the County of Mobile.

Student life

Publications
Baker High School publishes a semi-monthly newsletter called the Hornet Herald.

Uniforms
As part of the Mobile County Public School System, Baker High School conforms to a uniform policy.

Academic competition 
Baker High School became the first ever school from Alabama to win a nationwide Hi-Q championship, narrowly beating out Pennsylvania's Delaware County Christian School for the title in 2021 by a single point. Baker won the match on the final question, which was in mathematics.

Notable alumni
Blaine Clausell, former offensive tackle for the National Football League

References

External links

Baker High School

High schools in Mobile County, Alabama
Educational institutions established in 1903
Public high schools in Alabama
1903 establishments in Alabama